Archery at the 2019 Pacific Games in Apia, Samoa was held on 8–12 July 2019. The tournament was played on the outdoor target archery range at the Faleata Sports Complex in Tuanaimato, and included both recurve and compound bow events. Medals were awarded in men's and women's individual contests as well as for mixed team competitions.

The Prime Minister of Samoa, Tuilaepa Malielegaoi, qualified for his nation's team and was a competitor  for the host country in the compound bow discipline.

Teams
The nations competing at the 2019 Pacific Games archery tournament were:

World Archery Oceania also hosted a continental Olympic qualifying event for mixed team recurve that was held concurrently with the Pacific Games events. Australian archers competed at the Olympic qualifying event.

Medal summary

Medal table

Recurve

Compound

See also
 Archery at the Pacific Games

References

2019 Pacific Games
Archery at the Pacific Games
Pacific Games